Venda Nova is a neighborhood (bairro) of Belo Horizonte, the third largest city in Brazil. It is situated on the northern side of the city, between the downtown area and the Confins International Airport. It is known, among other things, for the "Quadras do Vilarinho" (Soccer courts on Vilarinho) and Shopping Norte. One of the principal arterial roads in the area is the Avenida Vilarinho that connects to Pedro I/Antônio Carlos e Cristiano Machado Avenues. These connect the area to the center of Belo Horizonte. Another, Rua Padre Pedro Pinto, takes its name from a Roman Catholic priest who was important in the early days of the region.

Neighbourhoods in Belo Horizonte